Gunasagari is a 1953 Indian Kannada-language film directed by H. L. N. Simha and produced by AVM Productions. It stars Gubbi Veeranna, Honnappa Bhagavathar and Pandari Bai. The music was composed by R. Sudarshanam. The film was released in Tamil as Sathya Sodhanai. Malayalam actor Prem Nazir had a small role in this film which was his only Kannada film appearance. Rajasulochana made her debut with this film.

Cast
 Gubbi Veeranna -Yogi Basalinga
 Honnappa Bhagavathar - Malla Shetty
 Pandari Bai - Gunasagari
 B. Jayamma - Gangavva
 T. S. Balaiah - Nirguna
 T. S. Kari Basayya - Muddanna
 B. Hanumanthachar - Amaru
 K. Basavaraju - Bhramaru
 Krishna Kumari - Mallakka
 Rajasulochana - Sister of Gunasagari
 C. V. V. Panthalu
 Prem Nazir

Soundtrack

Kannada songs
The lyrics were written by K. R. Seetharama Sastry

Tamil songs
The lyrics were written by Thanjai N. Ramaiah Dass, K. P. Kamatchisundaram, Ku. Ma. Balasubramaniam, V. Seetharaman and Papanasam Sivan.

References

External links
 

1953 films
Films scored by R. Sudarsanam
1950s Kannada-language films
Indian black-and-white films
Films directed by H. L. N. Simha